The 2007 CIS Men's Soccer Championship was held from 8 to 11 November 2008 at the University of British Columbia in Vancouver, British Columbia.  The UBC Thunderbirds defeated the Laval Rouge et Or 2-1.

All-Canadians
First Team(1-11) and Second Team(12-22) with school and hometown.

Final

Bracket

All-Canadians
First team (school and home town listed also)

Second team (school and home town listed also)

Bialy, the CIS player of the year in 2006, and Marquez are both selected for the second straight season.

U Sports men's soccer championship
Cis Mens Soccer Championship, 2007